Song of India is a 1949 American adventure film directed by Albert S. Rogell and starring Sabu, Gail Russell and Turhan Bey.

Plot
Jungle adventure drama about a young man and his wild animal friends attempting to thwart a government-approved hunting expedition.

Cast

Production
Filming took place on 19 June 1948, after two weeks of second unit filming. Gail Russell was borrowed from Paramount Pictures.

See also
 List of American films of 1949

References

External links

1949 films
1940s English-language films
American adventure films
1949 adventure films
American black-and-white films
Films set in India
Films directed by Albert S. Rogell
1940s American films